Kuku 3D is the first Slovak stereoscopic (3D) movie. It was released in December 2013.

External links
  at Filmodrom 
 

2013 3D films
2013 films
Slovak horror films
Slovak short films